Polygonum exsertum is a species of flowering plant in the family Polygonaceae, native to Illinois. It was first described by John Kunkel Small in 1894.

It has also been treated as a synonym of Polygonum ramosissimum Michx.

References

exsertum
Flora of Illinois
Plants described in 1894
Flora without expected TNC conservation status